The men's Distance medley relay at the 2015 IAAF World Relays was held at the Thomas Robinson Stadium on 3 May.  This was the first time the event was held at a World Championship level meet.  The previous world best, set by a Kenyan team in 2006 at the Penn Relays was elevated to World Record status due to the inclusion of the event in the World Relays. The event takes in a 1200m leg followed by a 400m leg, then an 800m leg before finishing with a 1600m leg.

In the first leg, Australian Ryan Gregson took it out in 2:53.15 to take a 5-meter lead over American Kyle Merber with Kenya another 7 meters back. Alexander Beck held the lead but Kenya's Alphas Leken Kishoyian gained a half a second on the leading two teams to pull his team back into contention.  The 800 metre leg was thrilling as  Brandon Johnson quickly passed Jordan Williamsz only to be overtaken by Ferguson Cheruiyot Rotich.  Johnson used his best strategic tactics to edge back into the lead by the handoff.  But Ben Blankenship had no interest in the lead, literally slowing down and inviting Timothy Cheruiyot to take over.  Cheruiyot more than obliged, accelerating to a much faster pace breaking away from Blankenship possibly trying to steal the race while Collis Birmingham brought Australia back into the mix.  After a little more than 2 laps, Cheruiyot began to pay the price for his early pace.  As he tied up, Blankenship cruised by, but the race wasn't over.  Cheruiyot stayed on Blankenship's heels and on the final backstretch, Blankenship showed signs of vulnerability.  But coming off the turn, Blankenship had more speed and was able to pull away to the finish line.  Setting a new world record, a .06 of a second improvement over the 9-year-old world record was just an after thought.

Records
Prior to the competition, the records were as follows:

Schedule

Results

Final
The final was started at 20:51.

References

Distance medley relay